Copelatus strigipennis is a species of diving beetle. It is part of the subfamily Copelatinae in the family Dytiscidae. It was described by Laporte in 1835.

References

strigipennis
Beetles described in 1835